Mark Dickson and Jan Gunnarsson were the defending champions, but lost in the semifinals.

Anders Järryd and Hans Simonsson won the title, defeating Peter Fleming and Johan Kriek 6–3, 6–4 in the final.

Seeds
All seeds receive a bye into the second round.

Draw

Finals

Top half

Bottom half

References
Draw

Stockholm Open
1983 Grand Prix (tennis)